Sir Edgeworth Beresford David KBE CMG (12 June 1908 – 15 May 1965) was a colonial administrator. He was appointed as a cadet in the Colonial Office in 1930 and later became the Colonial Secretary of Hong Kong from 1955 to 1957 and the last Chief Secretary of Singapore from 1958 to 1959. He was also the Administrator of Hong Kong for a short period of time after Sir Alexander Grantham left Hong Kong and Sir Robert Black was named Governor in 1957.

Personal life
E.B. David was the son of Venerable Arthur Evan David and Kathleen Frances Kington.

Honours
David was appointed to following honours

Companion of St. Michael and St. George's Medal of Honor (CMG) (1954 British Queen's Birthday Awards)
Knight Commander of the Most Excellent Order of the British Empire (KBE) (1961 New Year's Awards)

References

Chief Secretaries of Hong Kong
1908 births
1965 deaths
People from Dulwich
Chief Secretaries of Singapore
Administrators in British Singapore